Tourism in Namibia is a major industry, contributing N$7.2 billion ( equal to US$ 390 million ) to the country's gross domestic product. Annually, over one million travelers visit Namibia, with roughly one in three coming from South Africa, then Germany and finally the United Kingdom, Italy and France. The country is among the prime destinations in Africa and is known for ecotourism which features Namibia's extensive wildlife.

In December 2010, Lonely Planet named Namibia 5th best tourist destination in the world in terms of value.

History
The first rough estimate took place in 1989, when it was predicted that 100,000 non-domestic tourists stayed in the country. This figure has risen over time to 1,176,000 visitors in 2014.

Employment
In 1996, around 600 jobs were related directly to the country's tourism sector. In 2008 it was estimated that 77,000 jobs directly or indirectly depend on Namibia's tourism, amounting to 18.2% of all formal jobs in Namibia. Tourism in Namibia also has had a positive impact on resource conservation and rural development. Some 50 communal conservancies have been established across the country, covering 11.8 million hectares of land and resulting in enhanced land management while providing tens of thousands of rural Namibians with much-needed income.

Rankings and evaluation
Lonely Planet ranked Namibia fifth on a world-wide chart of value-for-money destinations in 2010.

Tourist destinations

Windhoek

Windhoek, the capital and biggest city, is the main entrance point for people flying into the country, usually at Windhoek Hosea Kutako International Airport. Important tourist sites in Windhoek include: the Tintenpalast, (which is the seat of both the National Council and the National Assembly), Windhoek Country Club Resort (opened in 1995 as host to the Miss Universe 1995 and is one of the premier hotels and golf tournaments in the country), Zoo Park and other places. Windhoek also has the first five star hotel in the country known as Hilton Windhoek (opened in 2011 marking Hilton's 50th hotel in the Middle East and Africa.)

Walvis Bay

Walvis Bay, as the fourth biggest town in Namibia, is host to the main port of the country, as well as the Walvis Bay International Airport. Geographically the town is uniquely situated, as it is the meeting place of extreme landscapes – on the one side the Namib desert, the oldest desert in the world, and on the other side a massive lagoon and harbor flowing from the Atlantic Ocean. Both of these landscapes lend themselves towards some of the most unusual sightseeing opportunities in Namibia.

The lagoon and harbour is home to various species and large numbers of sea mammals and bird life. The Namib desert on the other side is called "The Living Desert", because of the large number of living species found there.
 
Walvis Bay is one of many tourism activity centers of Namibia. Activities include various water-related actions, like shore angling, boat angling, shark angling, sightseeing and photographic boat cruises, sea kayaking and wind- and kite surfing. Walvis Bay yearly houses one of the international legs of speed kite and windsurfing.
 
Land activities include Sandwich Harbour sightseeing tours, desert sightseeing tours, 4X4 dune driving tours into the massive dunes south of the Kuiseb river, dune hang gliding, dune boarding and dune skiing, guided educational, historic and anthropologic quad biking tours into the Kuiseb Delta, visits to the Topnaar people, descendants of the Khoin-Khoin, and living desert tours.

Swakopmund

Swakopmund is a beach resort and an example of German colonial architecture. It was founded in 1892 as the main harbour for German South-West Africa. Attractions include spectacular sand dunes near Langstrand south of the Swakop River. The city is known for extreme sports.  Nearby is a farm that offers camel rides to tourists and the Martin Luther steam locomotive, dating from 1896 and abandoned in the desert.
The city is also known for its surf culture being located close to the famous Skeleton Coast

The Desert Express, a TransNamib tourist train, runs between Windhoek and Swakopmund.

The Swakopmund Skydiving Club has operated from the Swakopmund Airport since 1974.

National Parks

Namibia has many prominent National Parks, the oldest, most visited and best known is Etosha National Park. Other national parks in Namibia are:
 Namib-Naukluft
 Skeleton Coast National Park
 Ai-Ais/Richtersveld Transfrontier Park with Fish River Canyon and Ai-Ais Hot Springs
 Waterberg Plateau Park
 Bwabwata National Park
 Dorob National Park
 Khaudum National Park
 Mudumu National Park
 Mangetti National Park
 Nkasa Rupara National Park
 Tsau ǁKhaeb National Park*

*In November 2012, the Namibian government approved the renaming of the Sperrgebiet National Park to Tsau ǁKhaeb (Sperrgebiet) National Park. Tsau ǁKhaeb derives from the local Nama language and means "deep sandy soils".

Kaokoveld
Koakoveld (also known as 'Kaokoland'), remains one of the country's most pristine regions. Puros Lodge and Okahirongo Elephant Lodge offer accommodation in an area regularly visited by desert elephants.

Extreme Sports
Namibia's harsh climate and arid conditions make the country a top spot for different extreme sport events like desert runs and ultra-triathlons.

One such event, the 2009 250 km RacingThePlanet: Namibia ultramarathon through the Fish River Canyon, across the Namib Desert, and along the Skeleton Coast to Lüderitz had 213 runners from 38 countries start the 7-day, 6-stage race and 167 finish.

The Namibia Tourism Board
The Namibia Tourism Board (NTB) was established by an Act of Parliament: the Namibia Tourism Board Act, 2000 (Act 21 of 2000). Its primary objectives are to regulate the tourism industry and to market Namibia as a tourist destination. As a statutory body, the NTB is the only legal national tourism organization or authority in Namibia mandated by Government to regulate the industry. The following sectors of business within or relating to the Namibian tourism industry are sectors that are regulated by the Namibia Tourism Board:
 Accommodation Establishments
 Activity Operators
 Air charter operators
 Booking agents
 Conference centre operators
 Foreign tour operators
 Shuttle and transport service operators
 Tour facilitators
 Tour and safari operators
 Trophy hunting operators
 Vehicle rental operators

Trade Associations
There are a number of trade associations that represent the tourism sector in Namibia, they include the following: 
 Namibia Travel & Tourism Forum
Federation of Namibia Tourism Associations (the umbrella body for all tourism associations in Namibia)
 Hospitality Association of Namibia 
 Association of Namibian Travel Agents
 Car Rental Association of Namibia
 Tour and Safari Association of Namibia

Statistics

See also
Visa policy of Namibia

References

 Weaver, David, and Katharine Elliot. "Spatial Patterns and Problems in Contemporary Namibian Tourism." The Geographical Journal 162.2(1996): 205-217.

External links

 Namibia Tourism Board
 Namibia Travel website
 Tourists best destinations in Namibia

 
Namibia